Rajiv Vijay Raghavan (born 29 May 1958) is an Indian director, script writer, and producer. His debut feature film was Margam (film). He had also made a number of documentaries. He is an alumnus of Film & TV Institute of India, Pune, and assisted G. Aravindan .

Life
Rajiv Vijay Raghavan was born on 29 May 1958 in Kottayam, Kerala, South-western India. 

He was active in politics and literature in his college days at Kottayam and was a council member of the University Students Union of Kerala University during 1977–78. After graduating in Commerce from the University of Kerala he joined the Film & TV Institute of India, Pune, during 1979–81. 

Raghavan took a job in Canara Bank on 1981 and worked there for 10 years. In the meantime, he closely acquainted with G. Aravindan and assisted him in 6 feature films during 1981–1991. Rajiv's debut documentary film,  Sister Alphonsa of Bharananganam, 1986 which portrays the life of Saint Alphonsa (Sister Alphonsa then) had won the National Film Award for the best biographical documentary.
After resigning from Canara Bank, Raghavan worked as Producer in Centre for Development of Imaging Technology, Kerala (C-DIT) during 1991-98 and made documentaries such as Kesari(1992), Ruin of the Commons(1993), Nirmithi(1994) and Seeds of Malabar (1996). On 2003, under the banner of Image commune, a collective founded for the sake of promoting independent films, Rajiv made his milestone film, Margam (film) (The Path).

Filmography
He had assisted director G. Aravindan in six feature films during 1981–91. He directed nine documentaries and short films including Sister Alphonsa of Bharananganam (1987)  , People Matter-Women’s rights in India (1988), Kesari (1992), Ruin of the Commons (1993),  Nirmithi (1994), Seeds of Malabar (1996) and Building the Bridge - a story of Gender equity, 2000. He has also directed the feature Film: Margam (film).

Sister Alphonsa of Bharananganam – a Historical Document
Sister Alphonsa of Bharananganam is about a nun from Kerala who would have been declared the first Catholic Saint from India in 2009. The print of the film was recovered a few days before the declaration ceremony in Rome and was screened during the holy event.

Margam
Margam (film),  His debut feature film is an adaptation of Pithrutharppanam by M. Sukumaran. The film won seven major Kerala State Film Awards of the Government of Kerala and one National Film Award oin the year 2003. Margam (film) participated in 16 international film festivals and won six international awards in different categories including best film and scripting. The Script co-written by Rajiv Vijay Raghavan, Anvar Ali and  S P Ramesh, Cinematography by Venu and the roles performed by Nedumudi Venu and Meera Krishna were also appreciated.

References

External links
 

Film directors from Kerala
Malayalam film directors
Living people
1958 births
Kerala State Film Award winners
Artists from Kottayam
21st-century Indian film directors
Screenwriters from Kerala
20th-century Indian film directors
Malayalam screenwriters
Director whose film won the Best Debut Feature Film National Film Award
Producers who won the Best Debut Feature Film of a Director National Film Award